Nyikina (also Nyigina, Njigina) is an Australian Aboriginal language of Western Australia, spoken by the Nyigina people.

Warrwa may have been a dialect.

Classification
R. M. W. Dixon (2002) regards Nyikina, Warrwa, Yawuru and Jukun as a single language.

Nyikina is placed in the Nyulnyulan family of non-Pama–Nyungan languages.

See also
Belinda Dann
Loongkoonan
Butcher Joe Nangan

References

External links
The film "Mad Bastards" (2010) depicting Nyikina language and culture

Nyulnyulan languages
Kimberley (Western Australia)